Flukenoi Kiatfahlikit (ฟลุ๊คน้อย เกียรติฟ้าลิขิต) is a Thai Muay Thai fighter.

Muay Thai career
Flukenoi started training in Muay Thai at a camp owned by his father, the Kiatfahlikit gym.

On March 19, 2021 Flukenoi faced  Dechsakda Sor.Jor Tongprachin at Rangsit Stadium for the True4U Muaymanwansuk promotion. Flukenoi won the fight by decision.

Flukenoi was scheduled to fight Mongkolpetch Petchyindee Academy on a major card in the Buriram province on November 4, 2021. He won the fight by decision.

On February 17, 2022 Flukenoi challenged Petchdam Petchyindee Academy for his True4u 135 lbs title at Rajadamnern Stadium for the Petchyindee promotion. Flukenoi won the fight by decision.

On March 22, 2022 Flukenoi made the first defense of his True4U 135 lbs title against Rungkit Wor.Sanprapai at Rajadamnern Stadium. Flukenoi won the fight by decision.

On May 22, 2022 Flukenoi faced Kimluay SorJor.TongPrachin for the fourth time in three years at Rajadamnern Stadium. Flukenoi was knocked down by an elbow strike in the second round but scored a comeback knockout win in round 4 with a high kick, successfully defending his True4U 135 lbs title for the second time.

On June 20, 2022 Flukenoi extended his undefeated streak to 10 when he was awarded a decision win over the 2021 Sports Authority of Thailand Fighter of the Year Lamnamoonlek Or.Atchariya during a U-Muay and Palangmai co-promoted event at Rajadamnern Stadium.

Titles and accomplishments
Petchyindee True4U
 2022 True4U 135 lbs Champion (two defenses)

World Muay Thai Council
 2016 WMC World 108 lbs Champion

Awards
 2022 Rajadamnern Stadium Fighter of the Year

Fight record

|-  style="background:#fbb"
| 2023-03-09 || Loss ||align=left| Tongnoi Wor.Sangprapai || Petchyindee, Rajadamnern Stadium  || Bangkok, Thailand || Decision || 5 ||3:00

|-  style="background:#fbb"
| 2023-02-16 || Loss ||align=left| Samingdet Nor.Anuwatgym || Petchyindee, Rajadamnern Stadium  || Bangkok, Thailand || Decision || 5 ||3:00

|-  style="background:#fbb"
| 2022-12-28 || Loss ||align=left| Petchdam Petchyindee Academy || Muay Thai Rakya Soosakon + SAT Super Fight Withee Tin Thai + Petchyindee  || Bangkok, Thailand || Decision (Unanimous)|| 5 ||3:00

|-  style="background:#fbb;"
| 2022-11-18 || Loss ||align=left| Chalam Parunchai || Ruamponkon + Prachin || Prachinburi province, Thailand || Decision ||5 ||3:00

|-  style="background:#fbb;"
| 2022-08-12|| Loss ||align=left| Mathias Gallo Cassarino  || Rajadamnern World Series || Bangkok, Thailand || Decision (Split) ||3  ||3:00 

|-  style="background:#cfc;"
| 2022-06-20|| Win||align=left| Lamnamoonlek Or.Atchariya  || U-Muay RuamJaiKonRakMuayThai + Palangmai, Rajadamnern Stadium|| Bangkok, Thailand || Decision || 5 || 3:00

|-  style="background:#cfc;"
| 2022-05-19||Win ||align=left| Kimluay SorJor.TongPrachin|| Petchyindee, Rajadamnern Stadium || Bangkok, Thailand || TKO (High kick)|| 4||
|-
! style=background:white colspan=9 |

|-  style="background:#cfc;"
| 2022-03-25|| Win ||align=left| Rungkit Wor.Sanprapai|| Muaymanwansuk, Rajadamnern Stadium || Bangkok, Thailand || Decision|| 5 ||3:00
|-
! style=background:white colspan=9 |

|-  style="background:#cfc;"
| 2022-02-17|| Win ||align=left| Petchdam Petchyindee Academy || Petchyindee, Rajadamnern Stadium || Bangkok, Thailand || Decision || 5|| 3:00 
|-
! style=background:white colspan=9 |

|-  style="background:#cfc;"
| 2022-01-13|| Win ||align=left| Kimluay Sor.Jor Tongprachin || Petchyindee, Rangsit Stadium || Rangsit, Thailand || Decision || 5|| 3:00 

|-  style="background:#c5d2ea;"
| 2021-12-16 || Draw||align=left| Samingdet Nor.Anuwatgym || Petchyindee, Rangsit Stadium || Rangsit, Thailand || Decision ||5 || 3:00
 
|-  style="background:#cfc;"
| 2021-11-04|| Win ||align=left| Mongkolpetch Petchyindee Academy || Petchyindee + Muay Thai Moradok Kon Thai || Buriram Province, Thailand || Decision || 5 || 3:00

|-  style="background:#cfc;"
| 2021-10-17|| Win ||align=left| Moradokpetch Muayded789 || Petchyindee, Rangsit Stadium || Rangsit, Thailand || Decision || 5|| 3:00 

|-  style="background:#cfc;"
| 2021-03-19 || Win ||align=left| Dechsakda Sor.Jor Tongprachin || True4U Muaymanwansuk, Rangsit Stadium || Rangsit, Thailand || Decision ||5 || 3:00

|-  style="text-align:center; background:#cfc;"
| 2020-12-18|| Win ||align=left| Denputhai Kiatmoo9 || Muaymanwansuk, Rangsit Stadium || Rangsit, Thailand ||  Decision || 5 || 3:00 

|-  style="text-align:center; background:#fbb;"
| 2020-10-30|| Loss ||align=left| Saksit Tor.Paopiamsapraedriew|| Muaymanwansuk, Rangsit Stadium || Rangsit, Thailand ||  Decision || 5 || 3:00 

|-  style="text-align:center; background:#fbb;"
| 2020-09-22|| Loss ||align=left| Rittidet Sitchefboontham|| ChefBoontham, Thanakorn Stadium || Thailand ||  Decision || 5 || 3:00 

|-  style="text-align:center; background:#cfc;"
| 2020-08-21|| Win ||align=left| Nawaek Sitchefboontham||Muaymanwansuk, Rangsit Stadium || Rangsit, Thailand ||  Decision || 5 || 3:00 

|-  style="text-align:center; background:#cfc;"
| 2020-07-24|| Win ||align=left| Kimluay Santi-Ubon || Muaymanwansuk, Rangsit Stadium || Rangsit, Thailand ||  KO || 3 ||  

|-  style="text-align:center; background:#cfc;"
| 2020-03-09|| Win ||align=left| Surachai Nayyoksanya || Palangmai, Rajadamnern Stadium || Bangkok, Thailand ||  Decision || 5 || 3:00 

|-  style="text-align:center; background:#cfc;"
| 2020-02-14|| Win ||align=left| Soodlow Petchbanpar || True4U Muaymanwansuk + Petchnumnoi, Lumpinee Stadium || Bangkok, Thailand || TKO (Knees to the body & elbow)|| 2 || 

|-  style="background:#fbb;"
| 2019-10-24|| Loss ||align=left| Samingdet Nor.Anuwatgym || Wan Kingthong, Rajadamnern Stadium ||Bangkok, Thailand || KO (Left elbow)|| 4 ||

|-  style="text-align:center; background:#cfc;"
| 2019-09-11|| Win ||align=left| Saksit Tor.Paopiamsapraedriew || Wan Kingthong, Rajadamnern Stadium || Bangkok, Thailand || Decision || 5 || 3:00 

|-  style="text-align:center; background:#fbb;"
| 2019-08-05|| Loss ||align=left| Tongnoi Lukbanyai || Petchyindee, Rajadamnern Stadium || Bangkok, Thailand || Decision || 5 || 3:00

|-  style="text-align:center; background:#cfc;"
| 2019-07-05|| Win ||align=left| Denputhai Kiatmoo9 || Petchypiya, Lumpinee Stadium ||Bangkok, Thailand || KO (Elbow)|| 3 || 

|-  style="text-align:center; background:#cfc;"
| 2019-06-07|| Win ||align=left| Dansiam Kudramgym || Petchypiya, Lumpinee Stadium ||Bangkok, Thailand || Decision || 5 || 3:00

|-  style="text-align:center; background:#cfc;"
| 2019-04-05|| Win ||align=left| Dodo Mor.Rachapatmunbanchombung || Petchypiya, Lumpinee Stadium ||Bangkok, Thailand || Decision || 5 || 3:00

|-  style="text-align:center; background:#c5d2ea;"
| 2019-03-01|| Draw ||align=left| Tongnoi Lukbanyai || Petchpiya, Lumpinee Stadium || Bangkok, Thailand || Decision || 5 || 3:00

|-  style="text-align:center; background:#fbb;"
| 2019-01-04|| Loss ||align=left| Kimluay Santi-Ubon || Petchpiya, Lumpinee Stadium || Bangkok, Thailand || Decision || 5 || 3:00

|-  style="text-align:center; background:#fbb;"
| 2018-11-26|| Loss ||align=left| Padejsuk Kor.Kampanat|| Wanmeechai, Rajadamnern Stadium || Bangkok, Thailand || Decision || 5 || 3:00

|-  style="background:#fbb;"
| 2018-08-29|| Loss ||align=left| Phetpangan Mor.Ratanabandit || Petchaopraya, Rajadamnern Stadium ||Bangkok, Thailand || Decision || 5 || 3:00

|-  style="text-align:center; background:#cfc;"
| 2018-07-30|| Win ||align=left| Denputhai Kiatmoo9 || Petchyindee, Rajadamnern Stadium ||Bangkok, Thailand || KO (Right cross)||2 || 

|-  style="text-align:center; background:#cfc;"
| 2018-07-13|| Win ||align=left| Klassik Sitkrusawan || Muaymanwansuk, Rangsit Stadium ||Rangsit, Thailand || KO (Right elbow)||3 ||  

|-  style="text-align:center; background:#fbb;"
| 2018-04-30|| Loss ||align=left| Padejsuk Kor.Kampanat|| Petchyindee, Rajadamnern Stadium || Bangkok, Thailand || Decision || 5 || 3:00

|-  style="text-align:center; background:#cfc;"
| 2018-03-19|| Win ||align=left| Detchaiya Petchyindee || Wan Kingthong, Rajadamnern Stadium ||Bangkok, Thailand || KO ||3 ||  

|-  style="text-align:center; background:#cfc;"
| 2018-02-16|| Win ||align=left| Kempetch Phunphanmuang|| Muaymanwansuk, Rangsit Stadium ||Rangsit, Thailand || TKO (Referee stopapge)||4 ||  

|-  style="text-align:center; background:#fbb;"
| 2017-11-10|| Loss ||align=left| Yimsiam Nakhonmuangdej|| Muaymanwansuk, Rangsit Stadium ||Rangsit, Thailand || Decision || 5 || 3:00 

|-  style="text-align:center; background:#cfc;"
| 2017-09-29|| Win ||align=left| Ekthoranin Mor.Krungtepthonburi|| Muaymanwansuk, Rangsit Stadium ||Rangsit, Thailand || Decision || 5 || 3:00 

|-  style="text-align:center; background:#cfc;"
| 2017-09-01|| Win ||align=left| Bigboom Bemdeside|| Muaymanwansuk, Rangsit Stadium ||Rangsit, Thailand || Decision || 5 || 3:00 

|-  style="text-align:center; background:#cfc;"
| 2017-08-11|| Win ||align=left| Weeraponlek Wor Wanchai|| Muaymanwansuk, Rangsit Stadium ||Rangsit, Thailand || Decision || 5 || 3:00 

|-  style="text-align:center; background:#fbb;"
| 2017-06-23|| Loss ||align=left| Bigboom Bemdeside|| Muaymanwansuk, Rangsit Stadium ||Rangsit, Thailand || Decision || 5 || 3:00 

|-  style="text-align:center; background:#cfc;"
| 2017-05-11|| Win||align=left| Akemongkon Nor.Anuwatgym || Wanmeechai, Rajadamnern Stadium ||Bangkok, Thailand || Decision || 5 || 3:00 

|-  style="text-align:center; background:#fbb;"
| 2017-04-12|| Loss ||align=left| Weeraponlek Wor Wanchai|| Wan Kingthong, Rajadamnern Stadium ||Bangkok, Thailand || Decision || 5 || 3:00 

|-  style="text-align:center; background:#fbb;"
| 2017-02-24|| Loss ||align=left| Boonlong Petchyindee|| Muaymanwansuk, Rangsit Stadium ||Rangsit, Thailand || Decision || 5 || 3:00 

|-  style="text-align:center; background:#cfc;"
| 2017-01-18|| Win||align=left| Akemongkon Nor.Anuwatgym || Wan Kingthong, Rajadamnern Stadium ||Bangkok, Thailand || Decision || 5 || 3:00 

|-  style="text-align:center; background:#cfc;"
| 2016-12-05|| Win||align=left| Sinprathai Priewwayo|| Wan Kingthong, Rajadamnern Stadium ||Bangkok, Thailand || Decision || 5 || 3:00 

|-  style="text-align:center; background:#cfc;"
| 2016-11-14|| Win ||align=left| Kaito Wor.Wanchai || Wan Kingthong + Phetwiset, Rajadamnern Stadium ||Bangkok, Thailand || Decision || 5 || 3:00

|-  style="text-align:center; background:#fbb;"
| 2016-10-05|| Loss ||align=left| Sinprathai Priewwayo|| Wan Kingthong, Rajadamnern Stadium ||Bangkok, Thailand || Decision || 5 || 3:00 

|-  style="text-align:center; background:#cfc;"
| 2016-08-26|| Win ||align=left| Wattana MTM Academy|| Muaymanwansuk, Rangsit Stadium ||Rangsit, Thailand || Decision || 5 || 3:00 

|-  style="text-align:center; background:#cfc;"
| 2016-06-10|| Win ||align=left| Numtrungnoi Singpomprab|| Weerapol, Lumpinee Stadium ||Bangkok, Thailand || Decision || 5 || 3:00 
|-
! style=background:white colspan=9 |

|-  style="text-align:center; background:#cfc;"
| 2016-05-13|| Win ||align=left| Nuathoranee Jitmuangnon|| Phiranan, Lumpinee Stadium ||Bangkok, Thailand || Decision || 5 || 3:00 

|-  style="text-align:center; background:#cfc;"
| 2016-04-19|| Win ||align=left| Rattanaphon Sitthongpon|| Weerapol, Lumpinee Stadium ||Bangkok, Thailand || Decision || 5 || 3:00 

|-  style="text-align:center; background:#cfc;"
| 2016-03-18|| Win ||align=left| Dodo Mor.Rachapatmubanchombung|| Lumpinee Stadium ||Bangkok, Thailand || Decision || 5 || 3:00 

|-  style="text-align:center; background:#cfc;"
| 2015-09-20|| Win ||align=left| Sungfah Nor.Anuwatgym|| Muay Dee Vithithai, Rangsit Stadium ||Rangsit, Thailand || Decision || 5 || 3:00 

|-  style="text-align:center; background:#cfc;"
| 2015-08-17|| Win ||align=left| Fahsanchai Thanasuranakorn|| Petchyindee, Lumpinee Stadium ||Bangkok, Thailand || TKO (Knees to the body) || 4 || 

|-  style="text-align:center; background:#cfc;"
| 2015-07-24|| Win ||align=left| Mongkolsap Wongklasuek|| Petchyindee, Lumpinee Stadium ||Bangkok, Thailand || KO || 2 || 

|-
| colspan=9 | Legend:

References

2001 births
Flukenoi Kiatfahlikit
Living people
Flukenoi Kiatfahlikit